Xavier Ract-Madoux was a French hydraulician.  He joined Electricité de France (EDF) in 1947 and remained with them for the rest of his working life.  He became Controller General of EDF in 1973, and later became a vice-director.  He was a member of the Société Hydrotechnique de France and the General Secretary of the French Committee of Large Dams.

References

Sources 
 

Hydraulic engineers
20th-century French civil servants
20th-century French engineers